Dracula polyphemus is a species of orchid.

polyphemus